Maureen Jane Teefy  is an American actress. She is best known for her appearances in the films Fame (1980), Grease 2 (1982), Supergirl (1984), and Startime (1992).

Her last film appearances to date were in the 1997 film Men Seeking Women, then 20 years later in 2017's Hollywood Girl: The Peg Entwistle Story.

Life and career
Teefy was born in Minneapolis, Minnesota, one of eight sisters in a large Irish Catholic family.

Her first film role was a small part as a U.S.O. singer in the 1979 Steven Spielberg comedy 1941 and in the same year she appeared in two minor productions, Fyre and Scavenger Hunt.

She was one of the principal performers in the 1980 Alan Parker musical drama Fame, portraying Doris, a naive young acting student. In 1981, she starred in the CBS Afternoon Playhouse episode "Portrait of a Teenage Shoplifter".

Other films featuring Teefy include Grease 2 (1982) as Sharon Cooper, Supergirl (1984) as Lucy Lane, and Sunset (1988). She starred in the 1993 supernatural horror thriller Star Time, directed by Alexander Cassini (married 1982 - 2006).

She provided the voice of the female robot "host" Chrome on the 1997 HBO horror series Perversions of Science. Other television roles include the made-for-TV films Legs and Disaster at Silo 7. She also guest-starred on TV series including Max Headroom and Mike Hammer, Private Eye. Her acting career developed much more in the theater, singing and dancing in several Broadway musicals.

Maureen wrote, produced and starred in A Subject for a Short Story.

Filmography

Soundtrack

In the movie Grease 2, Maureen Teefy sings a duet with Peter Frechette (Do It For Our Country). However she could not make it to recording sessions for the song, so Frechette sings the song solo on the soundtrack. Teefy was dubbed in later for the film's sequence.

References

External links
 

American film actresses
American musical theatre actresses
American stage actresses
American television actresses
American voice actresses
20th-century American actresses
American people of Irish descent
Living people
Actresses from Minneapolis
Year of birth missing (living people)